Panopoda rufimargo, the red-lined panopoda, is an owlet moth in the family Erebidae. The species was first described by Jacob Hübner in 1818. It is found in North America.

The MONA or Hodges number for Panopoda rufimargo is 8587.

References

Further reading

 

Eulepidotinae
Moths described in 1818